The 2024 NCAA Division I men's basketball tournament will involve 68 teams playing in a single-elimination tournament to determine the National Collegiate Athletic Association (NCAA) Division I men's college basketball national champion for the 2023–24 season. The 85th annual edition of the tournament will begin on March 19, 2024, and will conclude with the championship game on April 8, at State Farm Stadium in Glendale, Arizona.

Tournament procedure

Pending any changes, a total of 68 teams will enter the 2024 tournament. A total of 32 automatic bids are awarded to each program that won a conference tournament. The remaining 36 bids are issued "at-large", with selections extended by the NCAA Selection Committee. The Selection Committee also seeded  the entire field from 1 to 68.

Eight teams (the four-lowest seeded automatic qualifiers and the four lowest-seeded at-large teams) play in the First Four. The winners of these games will advance to the main bracket of the tournament.

2024 NCAA Tournament schedule and venues         
The following are the sites selected to host the each round of the 2024 tournament:

First Four
March 19 and 20
University of Dayton Arena, Dayton, Ohio (Host: University of Dayton)

First and Second Rounds (Subregionals)
March 21 and 23
Spectrum Center, Charlotte, North Carolina (Host: University of North Carolina at Charlotte)
CHI Health Center, Omaha, Nebraska (Host: Creighton University)
PPG Paints Arena, Pittsburgh, Pennsylvania (Host: Duquesne University)
Spokane Veterans Memorial Arena, Spokane, Washington (Host: University of Idaho)
March 22 and 24
Barclays Center, Brooklyn, New York (Host: Atlantic 10 Conference)
Gainbridge Fieldhouse, Indianapolis, Indiana (Host: IUPUI, Horizon League)
Vivint Arena, Salt Lake City, Utah (Host: University of Utah)
FedExForum, Memphis, Tennessee (Host: University of Memphis)

Regional Semi-Finals and Finals
March 28 and 30
East Regional
TD Garden, Boston, Massachusetts (Host: Boston College)
West Regional
 Crypto.com Arena, Los Angeles, California (Host: Pepperdine University)
March 29 and 31
South Regional
American Airlines Center, Dallas, Texas (Host: Big 12 Conference)
Midwest Regional
Little Caesars Arena, Detroit, Michigan (Host: University of Detroit Mercy, Oakland University)

National Semifinals and Championship
April 6 and 8
State Farm Stadium, Glendale, Arizona (Host: Arizona State University)

Glendale will host the Final Four for the second time, having previously hosted in 2017.

Media Coverage

Television

CBS Sports and Turner Sports have US television rights to the tournament. As part of a cycle that began in 2016, TBS will televise the 2024 Final Four and the National Championship Game.

This will be the first tournament with Ian Eagle as the lead play-by-play announcer.

Television channels
Selection Show – CBS
First Four – TruTV
First and Second Rounds – CBS, TBS, TNT and TruTV  
Regional Semifinals and Finals – CBS and TBS
National Semifinals (Final Four) and Championship – TBS

Radio
Westwood One will have exclusive coverage of the entire tournament.

See also 
2024 NCAA Division I Women's Basketball Tournament

References

Tournament
NCAA Division I men's basketball tournament
NCAA Division I men's basketball tournament